Furanoflavonoids are flavonoids possessing a furan group.

An example of such a compound is karanjin, a furanoflavonol.

References

Flavonoids